A sixteen-segment display (SISD) is a type of display based on sixteen segments that can be turned on or off to produce a graphic pattern. It is an extension of the more common seven-segment display, adding four diagonal and two vertical segments and splitting the three horizontal segments in half. Other variants include the fourteen-segment display which does not split the top or bottom horizontal segments, and the twenty-two-segment display that allows lower-case characters with descenders.

Often a character generator is used to translate 7-bit ASCII character codes to the 16 bits that indicate which of the 16 segments to turn on or off.

Applications
Sixteen-segment displays were originally designed to display alphanumeric characters (Latin letters and Arabic digits). Later they were used to display Thai numerals and Persian characters.  Non-electronic displays using this pattern existed as early as 1902.

Before the advent of inexpensive dot-matrix displays, sixteen and fourteen-segment displays were used to produce alphanumeric characters on calculators and other embedded systems.  Later they were used on videocassette recorders (VCR), DVD players, microwave ovens, car stereos, telephone Caller ID displays, and slot machines.

Sixteen-segment displays may be based on one of several technologies, the three most common optoelectronics types being LED, LCD and VFD. The LED variant is typically manufactured in single or dual character packages, to be combined as needed into text line displays of a suitable length for the application in question; they can also be stacked to build multiline displays.

As with seven and fourteen-segment displays, a decimal point and/or comma may be present as an additional segment, or pair of segments; the comma (used for triple-digit groupings or as a decimal separator in many regions) is commonly formed by combining the decimal point with a closely 'attached' leftwards-descending arc-shaped segment. This way, a point or comma may be displayed between character positions instead of occupying a whole position by itself, which would be the case if employing the bottom middle vertical segment as a point and the bottom left diagonal segment as a comma. Such displays were very common on pinball machines for displaying the score and other information, before the widespread use of dot-matrix display panels.

Examples

See also

 Seven-segment display
 Eight-segment display
 Nine-segment display
 Fourteen-segment display
 Dot-matrix display
 Nixie tube display
 Vacuum fluorescent display

References

External links

 View and create sixteen-segment display characters - Editable SVG-Font, Open Font License
 Sixteen Segment Display with the HTML5 Canvas
 Web App to design segment-display
 Spinning segment display
 TwentyfourSixteen — CC0 sixteen segment TTF font based on the HP/Siemens/Litronix DL-2416 character set

Display technology